Sporocarp may refer to:

 Sporocarp (fungi), a multicellular structure on which spore-producing structures are borne
 Sporocarp (ferns), specialized spore-producing structure found in some ferns

See also
 Sorocarp, the fruiting body of certain cellular slime moulds